Moebelotinus is a monotypic genus of Asian dwarf spiders containing the single species, Moebelotinus transbaikalicus. It was first described by J. Wunderlich in 1995, and has only been found in Mongolia and Russia.

See also
 List of Linyphiidae species (I–P)

References

Linyphiidae
Monotypic Araneomorphae genera
Spiders of Asia
Spiders of Russia